Castillo de Gauzón (Gauzón Castle) is a ruined Spanish fortification. It is located in the municipality of Castrillón, Asturias, Spain. Little remains of it, partly because many of the stones that formed it were taken by the area residents to build houses and other structures.

The structure holds special significance for Asturias because it was there that the Victory Cross was encased in gold and precious stones. Archaeological excavations at the site dated it to the ninth century but more recent tests with Carbon-14 have dated construction to the mid-7th century.

See also
List of castles in Spain

References

Gauzon
Ruins in Spain
Buildings and structures completed in the 7th century
7th-century fortifications